Puerto Rico women's junior national softball team is the junior national under-17 team for Puerto Rico.  The team competed at the 2007 ISF Junior Women's World Championship in Enschede, Netherlands where they finished seventh.  The team competed at the 2011 ISF Junior Women's World Championship in Cape Town, South Africa where they finished tenth.   The team competed at the 2013 ISF Junior Women's World Championship in Brampton, Ontario where they finished sixth.

References

External links 
 International Softball Federation

Women's national under-18 softball teams
Softball in Puerto Rico
Softball